Chronos is a Russian music band formed in 2004 in Moscow. The project was started by Niсk Klimenko, a professional musician and sound engineer. The musical style of the project varies greatly within different genres of electronic music combined with motives of classical and ethnic music as well as vocal and recordings of nature sounds and live voices.

Band members 

 Nik Klimenko – ideology, music, keyboards.
 Alexey Ansheles – music, guitar.
 Galina Shchetinina – music, cello, vocals.
 Alexey Shapovalov – music, ethnic instruments, percussion.
 Dinara Yuldasheva – vocals, djembe.

About the project 

The progenitor of the band is Nick Klimenko, a composer, sound engineer, sound designer, the founder of electronic music school (Stereoschool) and a studio, the author of electronic music composing courses. Nick has been practising music in various forms since childhood, has finished the First National School of Television with a specialization in TV sound engineering. He used to act as a dj at many musical events in Russia and Europe and as a radio host at the first Russian Internet radio of electronic music Sunwave Radio. Nick is a Steinberg certificated tutor of Cubase 7 sequencer, an official sound-designer of the German company "Best Service GmbH, and also he has created sound libraries for synthesizers of such companies as Yamaha, Korg, Access.

At different time collaboration with labels: Altar Records (Canada), Soundmute Records (England), Sentimony Records (Ukraine), Random Records (Spain), Uxmal Records (Mexico), Beats & Pieces Records (Israel), Mystic Sound Records (Russia), Aventuel Records (Russia), Ajana Records (Netherlands), Plusquam Records (Germany), Ajnavision Records (Portugal), Cosmicleaf Records (Greece), and various musicians from all over the world (Aes Dana, Shulman, Khooman, Koan, Astropilot, Asura, Taff, Planetarium, Lemonchill, Astralwaves, Maiia, Side Liner, Zero Cult).

Chronos project was formed in 2004 when the first tracks were released in the compilation of the Russian label Quadro-disk, then in the compilation of the German label Ajana Records. In 2007 the debut album Steps to the Great Knowledge was released at the Sunline Records with its presentation at Flexible Dreams party in the Pag&Arm club. The same year Dmitriy Neschadim (aka С.J. Catalizer) joined the project, and the two young musicians played on numerous stages of Moscow, Moscow region, cities of Russia and Ukraine accompanied by live instruments and vocal. In 2009 the musicians released their cooperative album Quid Est Veritas, then Dmitriy left the project and different musicians have taken part in the project activity from then onward.

As of now Nick has released 7 studio albums, 10 EPs, a great number of tracks in compilations of different countries, soundtracks for video clips, degree works, and foreign TV-programmes about Nature. Chronos band gives performances in different types of environment: small clubs, large-scale parties, live concerts in cinemas and planetariums, at world-famous festivals, federal events.

Chronos music is a permanent experiment with new sounds and techniques on the stage and in the studio. Their music is a mix of modern rhythms and powerful sequences, the contemplative cello, expressive guitar solos and inspiring live instruments. Chronos music unites advanced electronic music (idm, psybient, chillout, trip-hop, downtempo, ambient, space music, breaks) with motives of funk, jazz, ethno, Flamenco and rock. Each full-band concert of Chronos project is a unique performance of atmospheric sounding of mixed genres and live instruments (guitar, cello, violin, saxophone, percussion, didgeridoo, tambourine, hang, Jew's harp).

Concurrently Nick is developing his solo breaks/progressive project NK Vibes and synthpop/electro-acoustic project Sparky4 in collaboration with Alexey Ansheles and Zhanna Kuzmina.

 Appearances  

 2007 – the Steps to the Great Knowledge album presentation at the Flexible Dreams party ("Pag&Arm", Moscow) 2008 – the Quid Est Veritas album presentation in the audio-visual art-project TIP World Party ("Forum hall", Moscow) 2009 – participation in the Echo psychedelic/chill-out festival (Kazan) 2010 – audio-accompaniment of Alex Grey's live-painting at the Transfiguration performance ("The roof of the World" club, Moscow) 2010 – participation in the 12-hour music marathon "Russia, forward" (VDNKh, Moscow) 2011 – live performance and exclusive presentation of the Inspirational Power album at the MicroCosmos party (the "Place" club, Saint Petersburg) 
 2011 – participation in the Spirit Base festivals (Austria and Hungary) 2012 – audio-visual concert and the When Mars Meets Venus album presentation in the Kyiv Planetarium «АTMASFERA 360»
 2012 – participation in the "Sticky Jam" festival in the "Da:Da» club, (Saint Petersburg) and the «Moscow Hall» club, (Moscow) 2012 — cosmic electronic music concerts in the «Salut» and «Molodyozhniy» cinemas (Moscow) 2012 — live concert of Chronos band in the «Shokoladnaya Fabrica» art-club (Moscow) 2013 — issue of the training video-course on composition and arrangement with zwook.ru
 2013 – participation in the street interactive sci-tech festival "Star Trek Fest" (Moscow) 2013 – the Helios album presentation at the auteur event Winter Ambient Session (the "Moychay.ru" tea club, Moscow) 2014 – a space concert at the 10th Winter Forum of Astronomy fans in the Crimean Astrophysical Observatory (Nauchniy, Crimea) 2014 – live performance at the "Connection to the space" party in the Tsekh creative place (Minsk) 2014 – participation in the "Trimurty" eco-dance festival (Tver region) 2014 – participation in the "Tortuga" festival (Moscow sea) 2014 – live full-band performance at the MicroCosmos Big Cosmic Journey party ("Place" club, Saint Petersburg) 2013–present – resident performances at the Mystic Sound parties (the "Vermel" club, Moscow) Discography 

 Studio albums 

1. "Steps to the Great Knowledge" (2007) 
 The Gates
 Step By Step
 Stonehendge
 Mandala
 Self Overcoming
 Mayan Artifact (part 1)
 Mayan Artifact (part 2)
 Shamora Ritual
 Mayan Artifact

2. "Quid Est Veritas" with C.J. Catalizer (2009)

 The Call
 4 AM
 Ice Hearts Age
 Unknown Civilizations
 Spiral Clouds (Kumharas Edit)
 Voice of Infinity
 Crystallic Sea
 Sounds of the World
 Across the Universe (album edit 2009)
 Sky Path (Zero Cult remix)
 Quid Est Veritas?

3. "Inspirational Power" (2010) 
 Autumn Leaves
 Planetarium (Ambient Version)
 Towards the Light House
 Deus Ex Machina
 Deep Unity (Album Version)
 Sky Path (Folk Remix)
 Planetarium (Taff Remix)
 Asura – The Prophecy (Chronos Remix)
 Optimistic Future
 Forgiveness

4. "When Mars Meets Venus, Part One: Mars» (2012) 
 Leaving Geia (Mechanical Edit)
 Arkturus
 Hi Tech Mosaic
 Sequenced Engine
 Zirda
 One Touch & Whole Life
 Shining Parallel World
 Lullaby for the Little Robot
 Broken Song
 Pain Feedback
 Alex Sparky

5. "When Mars Meets Venus, Part Two: Venus» (2012) 
 Leaving Geia
 Vector of Friendship
 Star Swimmer
 Red Planet
 Dark Flame Landing
 Soaring in Abyss
 Venus Eyes
 Eclipse of Inner World
 Galactic Winter

6. "Helios" (2013)

 Out of Chaos
 Moon Through a Lense
 Deimos
 Rotating Light Circles
 Osiris (feat. Proton Kinoun)
 Oracul
 Dolphinium
 Ancient Bells

7. "We Are One" (2014)

 Synth Tuning
 Endless Rotation of Feelings
 We Are One
 Space Cake (Gayatri Evening Version)
 Solar Movement 2013
 One Touch & Whole Life (United Rmx)
 Tetra Window Room
 Lullaby for the Little Robot (Acoustic Mix)
 Limits Breaker (Album Version)
 Alex Sparky (Progressive Mix)

 Remix albums and EPs 

  Natus in Spiritus (2009)
 Vargan (2010)
 When the Day Turns to Night (with Taff) (2010)
 Space Sweets & Logical Beats (2011)
 Limits Breaker (2012)
 Two Paths (2012)
 Tea & Music (2012)
 Mars & Venus remixes (2013)
 Improvisations (2014)
 Chronos & Alex Shapovalov – Warm Deep Space (2014)

 References 

  for the Korg portal
  in the Mushroom Magazine about the Inspirational Power album
  for the Morpheus Music portal about the Inspirational Power album
  for the Morpheus Music portal about the Natus in Spiritus EP
  of the Natus in Spiritus EP at the Ajana Records portal
  of the Helios'' album at the Altar Records portal
  by Nick Klimenko about the Russian community of psy-downtempo music at psybient.org

External links
 Facebook
 YouTube
 Vk
 Last.fm
 Soundcloud
 Yandex.Music
 Twitter
 promodj
 MySpace
 Discogs
 Official site

2004 establishments in Russia
Musical groups established in 2004
Musical groups from Moscow
Russian electronic music groups
Ambient music groups